The men's qualification for Under-23 football tournament at the 2011 All-Africa Games.

Qualification

Zone 1 (North Africa) 

Due to the political situation in Libya the clash was scheduled to take place on 24–26 June 2011 in Alexandria one match, but the Libyan federation withdraw.

|}

  qualified for the finals tournament.

Zone 2 (West Africa 1)

Preliminary Round 

The first leg is scheduled to take place on April 15–16. The second leg is scheduled to take place on May 1–3.

|}

The first leg is scheduled to take place on 16 April 2011. The second leg is scheduled to take place on 1 May 2011.

|}

Note: Guinea-Bissau disqualified for using an overage player.

First Round 

The first leg is scheduled to take place on 3 July 2011. The second leg is scheduled to take place on 10 July 2011.

|}

  qualified for the finals tournament.

Zone 3 (West Africa 2)

Preliminary Round 

The first leg is scheduled to take place on 16 April 2011. The second leg is scheduled to take place on 1 May 2011.

|}

First Round 

The first leg is scheduled to take place on 24–26 June 2011. The second leg is scheduled to take place on 8–10 July 2011

|}

  qualified for the finals tournament.

Zone 4 (Central Africa)

Preliminary Round 

The first leg is scheduled to take place on 16 April 2011. The second leg is scheduled to take place on 1 May 2011.

|}

  receive bye to the first round.

First Round 

The first leg is scheduled to take place on 24–26 June 2011. The second leg is scheduled to take place on 8–10 July 2011

|}

  qualified for the finals tournament.

Zone 5 (East Africa)

Preliminary Round 

The first leg is scheduled to take place on 16 April 2011. The second leg is scheduled to take place on 1 May 2011.

|}

The first leg is scheduled to take place on 17 April 2011.

|}

First Round 

The first leg is scheduled to take place on 24–26 June 2011. The second leg is scheduled to take place on 8–10 July 2011

|}

  qualified for the finals tournament.

Zone 6 (Southern Africa)

Preliminary Round 

The first leg is scheduled to take place on 8 January 2011. The second leg is scheduled to take place on 22–23 January 2011.

|}

Note:  withdrew, allowing  to compete.

First Round 

The first leg is scheduled to take place on 16 April 2011. The second leg is scheduled to take place on 1 May 2011.

|}

Second Round 

The first leg is scheduled to take place on 24–26 June 2011. The second leg is scheduled to take place on 8–10 July 2011

|}

  qualified for the finals tournament.

Zone 7 (Indian Ocean)

Preliminary Round 

The first leg was scheduled to take place on 15–17 April 2011 and the second leg on 29–30 April and 1 May 2011.

|}

  qualified for the finals tournament.

Qualified teams
The following countries have qualified for the final tournament:
  (hosts)
  (zone 1)
  (zone 2)
  (zone 3)
  (zone 4)
  (zone 5)
  (zone 6)
  (zone 7)

References 

Qualification
2011